James Frey (born September 12, 1969) is an American writer and businessman. His first two books, A Million Little Pieces (2003) and My Friend Leonard (2005), were bestsellers marketed as memoirs. Large parts of the stories were later found to be exaggerated or fabricated, sparking a media controversy. His 2008 novel Bright Shiny Morning was also a bestseller.

Frey is the founder and CEO of Full Fathom Five. A transmedia production company, FFF is responsible for the young adult adventure/science fiction series "The Lorien Legacies" of seven books written by Frey and others, under the collective pen name Pittacus Lore. Frey's first book of the series, I Am Number Four (2010), was made into a feature film by DreamWorks Pictures. He is also the CEO of NYXL, an esports organization based in New York.

Early life
Frey was born in Cleveland, Ohio. He is a Denison University alumnus, a history major from the class of 1992.

Career
Frey wrote the screenplays to the films Kissing a Fool and Sugar: The Fall of the West, the latter of which he also directed. Both were produced in 1998.

Doubleday published A Million Little Pieces in April 2003, which Frey wrote and marketed as a memoir of drug addiction, crime, and an eventual journey to sobriety. Initial reception was mostly positive, with Amazon.com editors selecting it as their favorite book of that year; and Frey followed it up with the sequel My Friend Leonard in 2005. The second book centered on the father-son relationship which Frey formed with his friend Leonard, from the Hazelden addiction treatment program. My Friend Leonard was published in June 2005 by Riverhead and became a bestseller. Significant parts of the two books, initially promoted as factual, later were revealed to have been invented by Frey (see ).

Despite the controversy, Frey signed a new three-book, seven-figure deal in late 2007 with HarperCollins to release his novel Bright Shiny Morning, published May 13, 2008. Bright Shiny Morning appeared on the New York Times bestseller list and received mixed reviews. The New York Times's Janet Maslin, who had been one of Frey's detractors, gave the book a rave review.

In 2011, The Final Testament of the Holy Bible, depicted as "the last book of the Bible" was released on Good Friday, April 22, 2011. Frey self-published e-editions of the book. A self-professed atheist, Frey suggested this work has reflected his attempt to write about a god that he "might actually believe in."

On August 19, 2010, the New York Post'''s "Page Six" gossip column reported that Frey has teamed with executive producers Mark Wahlberg and Steve Levinson to write the pilot for a one-hour drama for HBO that will focus on a behind-the-scenes look into the porn industry in Los Angeles. Frey described the show as "a sprawling epic about the porn business in LA. We're going to tell the type of stories no one else has told before and go places no one has gone before." In August 2012, Frey published "A Moving Story," chronicling the workplace organizing of a New York moving company, on the website Libcom.

On October 7, 2014, Endgame: The Calling, the first book in a trilogy of novellas by Frey and Nils Johnson-Shelton, was published by HarperCollins. It was turned into an augmented reality game by Google's Niantic Labs, and 20th Century Fox bought the movie rights. The premise of the novella is that aliens created human life on Earth and 12 ancient lines are destined to train a player to fight to the death for the survival of their line once Endgame begins. The book series will have clues, which will lead one lucky winner to a cash prize.

On November 18, 2015, Pepsi released "Black Knight Decoded," a fictional narrative imagining a conspiracy involving the Black Knight satellite legend. Frey was credited as the writer.

In 2019, Frey came up with the story idea for the film Queen & Slim, which Lena Waithe turned into a screenplay.

Controversy

A Million Little Pieces
Media skepticism
On January 8, 2006, The Smoking Gun website published an article called "A Million Little Lies: Exposing James Frey's Fiction Addiction," alleging that Frey fabricated large parts of his memoirs, including details about his criminal record. One incident in the book that came under particular scrutiny was a 1986 train-automobile collision in St. Joseph Township, Michigan.

The website stated that Frey was never incarcerated and that he had greatly exaggerated the circumstances of a key arrest detailed in the memoir: hitting a police officer with his car, while high on crack, which led to a violent mêlée with multiple officers and an 87-day jail sentence. In the police report that TSG uncovered, Frey was held at a police station for no more than five hours before posting a bond of a few hundred dollars for some minor offenses. The arresting officer, according to TSG, recalled Frey as having been polite and cooperative.

The book's hardcover (Doubleday) and paperback (Anchor Books) publishers initially stood by Frey, but examination of the evidence caused the publishers to alter their stances. As a consequence, the publishers decided to include a publisher's note and an author's note from Frey as disclaimers to be included in future publications.

The Minneapolis Star Tribune had questioned Frey's claims as early as 2003. Frey responded by saying, "I've never denied I've altered small details." In a May 2003 interview, Frey claimed that his publisher had fact-checked his first book.

On January 11, 2006, Frey appeared with his mother on Larry King Live. He defended his work, claiming that all memoirs alter minor details for literary effect. Frey consistently referred to the reality of his addiction, which he said was the principal point of his work. Oprah Winfrey called at the end of the show, defending the essence of Frey's book and the inspiration it provided to her viewers, but said she relied on the publisher to assess the book's authenticity.

Appearance on The Oprah Winfrey Show
On January 26, 2006, as more accusations against the book continued to surface, Winfrey invited Frey onto The Oprah Winfrey Show. She wanted to hear from him directly whether he had lied to her or "simply" embellished minor details, as he had told Larry King. Frey admitted to several of the allegations against him. He acknowledged that The Smoking Gun had been accurate when the website reported that Frey only spent a few hours in jail rather than the 87 days Frey claimed in his memoirs.

Winfrey then brought out Frey's publisher Nan Talese to defend her decision to classify the book as a memoir. Talese admitted that she had done nothing to check the book's veracity, despite the fact that her representatives had assured Winfrey's staff that the book was indeed non-fiction and described it as "brutally honest" in a press release.

Several columnists weighed in on the controversy, including David Carr of the New York Times, New York Times columnist Maureen Dowd, Larry King, and the Washington Post's Richard Cohen.

Aftermath
On January 31, 2006, it was announced that Frey had been dropped by his literary manager, Kassie Evashevski of Brillstein-Grey Entertainment, over matters of trust. In an interview with Publishers Weekly, Evashevski said that she had "never personally seen a media frenzy like this regarding a book before".

On February 1, 2006, Random House published Frey's note to the reader, which was included in later editions of the book. In the note, Frey apologized for fabricating portions of his book. On February 24, Frey's publicist revealed that Penguin imprint Riverhead had dropped out of a two-book, seven-figure deal with Frey. Riverhead previously published Frey's bestselling 2005 book My Friend Leonard.

On September 12, 2006, Frey and publisher Random House reached a tentative legal settlement, whereby readers who felt that they had been defrauded by Frey's A Million Little Pieces would be offered a refund. In order to receive the refund, customers had to submit a proof of purchase such as pieces of the book itself (page 163 from the hardcover or the front cover from the paperback) and complete a sworn statement indicating that they had purchased the book under the assumption that it was a memoir.

On July 28, 2007, at a literary convention in Texas, Nan Talese verbally attacked Oprah for misrepresenting the purpose of the interview on January 26, 2006. Just before air time, both Talese and Frey were told the topic of the show had been changed to "The James Frey Controversy".

On November 2, 2007, the Associated Press published a story about a judgment in favor of readers who felt deceived by Frey's claims of A Million Little Pieces's being a memoir. Although the publisher, Random House, had set aside $2.35 million for lawsuits, only 1,729 readers came forward to receive a refund for the book. The refund offer was extended to anyone who had purchased the book prior to Frey's disclosing the falsehoods therein. Chicago lawyer Larry D. Drury, who represented the class, received approximately $1.3 million for legal fees, distribution of the legal notice, and charitable donations to three charities, while total claimants' refunds issued to readers came to $27,348. The publisher also agreed to provide a disclosure at the beginning of the book, citing the somewhat fictitious nature of the text.

In May 2009, Vanity Fair reported that Winfrey had called Frey and apologized for the surprise topic change of the January 26, 2006 interview. She made a televised apology in 2011.

Following the events of Frey's Oprah appearance, South Park parodied the scandal surrounding the controversy in the episode "A Million Little Fibers".

Full Fathom Five
In 2009, Frey formed Full Fathom Five, a young adult novel publishing company that aimed to create highly commercial novels like Twilight. In November 2010, controversy arose when a Master of Fine Arts (MFA) student who had been in talks to create content for the company released her extremely limiting contract online. The contract allows Frey license to remove an author from a project at any time, does not require him to give the author credit for his/her work, and only pays a standard advance of $250. A New York magazine article titled "James Frey's Fiction Factory" gave more details about the company, including information about the highly successful "Lorien Legacies" series, a collaboration between MFA student Jobie Hughes and Frey. The article details how Frey removed Hughes from the project, allegedly during a screaming match between the two authors. In the article, Frey is accused of abusing and using MFA students as cheap labor to churn out commercial young adult books.

BibliographyA Million Little Pieces (2004)My Friend Leonard (2005)Bright Shiny Morning (2009)The Final Testament of the Holy Bible (2011)The Calling (Endgame Book 1) (2014)Sky Key (Endgame Book 2) (2015)The Complete Training Diaries (Origins, Descendant, Existence) (Endgame Omnibus) (2015)Rules of the Game (Endgame Book 3) (2016)Endgame: The Complete Zero Line Chronicles (2016) The Complete Fugitive Archives (Project Berlin, The Moscow Meeting, The Buried Cities) (2017)Katerina (2018)As a member of the collective pseudonym Pittacus Lore: Lorien LegaciesI Am Number Four (2010)The Power of Six (2011)The Rise of Nine (2012)The Fall of Five (2013)The Revenge of Seven (2014)The Fate of Ten (2015)United as One'' (2016)
Generation One (2017)
Fugitive Six (2018)
Return To Zero (2019)

References and footnotes

External links

 James Frey's Website and Blog
 
 Theodora & Callum Interview
 Transcript of January 11, 2006 interview with Larry King regarding the controversy over A Million Little Pieces
 Full transcript of Oprah/Frey interview held after controversy became public. Retrieved on 16-12-2009.

1969 births
American atheists
American male bloggers
American bloggers
American male screenwriters
Literary forgeries
Denison University alumni
Living people
Writers from Cleveland
Writers from Chicago
Writers from Shaker Heights, Ohio
Screenwriters from Ohio
Screenwriters from Illinois
21st-century American screenwriters
21st-century pseudonymous writers